South Colombian University, also known as USCO, is a public, national, university based primarily in the city of Neiva, Huila, Colombia.

See also

 List of universities in Colombia

Notes

External links
Universidad Surcolombiana official website 

Universities and colleges in Colombia